Foreign Affairs is a British sitcom that aired on ITV in 1964. It is a spin-off of Bootsie and Snudge, itself a spin-off of The Army Game and starred Alfie Bass and Bill Fraser as the main characters. The entire series was wiped and is no longer thought to exist.

Background
Seven months after the end of the third series of Bootsie and Snudge, where the title characters worked in a gentleman's club in central London, Alfie Bass and Bill Fraser reprised the roles they first played in The Army Game. Bootsie and Snudge went on to be revived for a fourth series in 1974. Foreign Affairs was written by Barry Took, Peter Jones (who was also the script editor), Richard Harris and Dennis Spooner.

Cast
Alfie Bass – Montague 'Bootsie' Bisley
Bill Fraser – Claude Snudge
Nicholas Phipps – Ambassador
Arthur Barrett – Third Secretary

Plot
Bootsie and Snudge are now employed by the diplomatic service and work at the British Embassy in the fictional Bosnik, somewhere in Europe. Snudge believes he is ambassador material whilst Bootsie is the security officer.

Episodes
Foreign Affairs aired on Thursdays at 7.30pm. Due to the archival policies of the time, all eight episodes were subsequently wiped and no longer exist.

References

External links

1964 British television series debuts
1964 British television series endings
1960s British sitcoms
Black-and-white British television shows
English-language television shows
ITV sitcoms
Lost television shows
Television shows produced by Granada Television
The Army Game